Tommy Anton Christensen (born 20 July 1961) is a Danish former footballer who played professionally for, amongst others, Elche CF in Spain, Brøndby in Denmark and Eintracht Braunschweig in Germany. He also played one game for the Denmark national football team.

Biography 

Born in Hillerød, Christensen got his national breakthrough when he scored two goals in his senior debut with AGF at the age of 17, and was immediately off to PSV Eindhoven in the Netherlands. After a few years of injuries at PSV, he moved back to play for AGF. While at AGF, he played his only Danish national team game in June 1983. He then moved to Elche in 1984, playing six games in the 1984–85 La Liga season. He played for English sides Leicester City and Portsmouth during the 1985–86 season, joining the clubs on one-month contracts in November and December 1985. He moved back to Denmark and played a total 32 games for Brøndby in all competitions. He then moved to rival team Vejle Boldklub, where he scored a total 10 goals in 31 games from July 1987 to June 1988. He then played 22 games and scored four goals for Braunschweig in the 1988–89 German 2. Bundesliga season. He ended his career in June 1989, having been plagued by injuries throughout his career.

References

External links 

 Danish national team profile 
 Tommy Christensen at worldfootball.net 

1961 births
Living people
Danish men's footballers
Danish expatriate men's footballers
Expatriate footballers in the Netherlands
Expatriate footballers in England
Expatriate footballers in Germany
Expatriate footballers in Spain
Denmark international footballers
Aarhus Gymnastikforening players
PSV Eindhoven players
Elche CF players
Leicester City F.C. players
Portsmouth F.C. players
Brøndby IF players
Vejle Boldklub players
Eintracht Braunschweig players
Eredivisie players
2. Bundesliga players
English Football League players
La Liga players
Danish expatriate sportspeople in Germany
Danish expatriate sportspeople in the Netherlands
Danish expatriate sportspeople in England
Danish expatriate sportspeople in Spain
Association football forwards
People from Hillerød Municipality
Sportspeople from the Capital Region of Denmark